Poasa Faamausili (born 14 February 1996) is a New Zealand rugby league footballer who plays as a  for the Dolphins in the National Rugby League (NRL). 

He previously played for the St. George Illawarra Dragons, the Sydney Roosters and the New Zealand Warriors in the NRL.

Background
Faamausili was born in Auckland, New Zealand. He is of Samoan descent. He attended Waitakere College.

He played his junior rugby league for the Glenora Bears in the Auckland Rugby League competition.

Playing career
Poasa played in the Sydney Roosters’ Holden Cup side from 2014 to 2016. Faamausili started in the front row in the Sydney Roosters’ 2016 Holden Cup premiership winning team.

Faamausili made his first grade debut in round 18 of the 2018 NRL season against the Gold Coast Titans.

In the 2020 NRL season, Faamausili was loaned to the New Zealand Warriors for a period of time.

On 15 October 2020, Faamausili signed a two-year-deal with the St. George Illawarra Dragons, becoming Anthony Griffin's first signing at the club.

He made his debut for St. George Illawarra in round 1 of the 2021 NRL season which saw the club lose 32–18 against rivals Cronulla.

He played a total of 11 matches for St. George Illawarra in the 2021 NRL season as the club finished 11th on the table and missed out on the finals.
He was released in October 2022 after not playing a game for the Dragons all season.

Statistics

References

External links

Sydney Roosters profile

1996 births
Living people
New Zealand rugby league players
New Zealand sportspeople of Samoan descent
Rugby league players from Auckland
Rugby league props
Sydney Roosters players
New Zealand Warriors players
St. George Illawarra Dragons players